Urville is a commune in the Aube department in north-central France. Urville has the highest average household income in France, at €142,888 per year (in 2020).

Population

See also
 Communes of the Aube department

References

Communes of Aube
Aube communes articles needing translation from French Wikipedia